The Prime Minister's Office; is the official office and residence of the Prime Minister of Albania. It is a ministerial level executive agency within the Government of Albania that handles the ministries and other political matters that are of great importance to the nation, such as corruption and elections. It also consists of the immediate staff of the Prime Minister, as well as multiple levels of support staff reporting to the Prime Minister.

The building was constructed in 1941 and is located at the Dëshmorët e Kombit Boulevard in Tirana, which is also the official residence and office for the Prime Minister of Albania.

Subordinate institutions
 Audit Agency of Assistance Programs accredited by the European Union
 Coordination Center Against Violent Extremism
 Management Agency of Water Resources
 Agency for the Delivery of Integrated Services
 Public Procurement Agency
 Territorial Development Agency
 State Agency for Strategic Programming and Aid Coordination
 National Agency for Information Society
 Agency for Dialogue and Co-governance
 Agency for Support of the Civil Society 
 State Cadastre Agency
 Albanian Telegraphic Agency
 Agency for Media and Information
 National Authority for Electronic Certification and Cyber Security
 State Authority for Geospatial Information
 State Bar
 Department of Public Administration
 General Directorate of Archives
 Directorate of Government Services
 Directorate of Securing Classified Information
 Central Inspectorate
 State Committee on Minorities
 State Committee of Cults
 Special Unit of Anticorruption and Antievasion 
 Albanian School of Public Administration
 State Intelligence Service
 Academy of Sciences

Officeholders

See also
Politics of Albania
Council of Ministers (Albania)

References

Government buildings in Tirana